is a Japanese businessman, and the founder, CEO and one-third owner of the online marketplace Mercari.

Early life
Yamada earned a degree in mathematics from Waseda University.

Career
His first job after university was as an intern at Rakuten, then a little-known e-commerce company, for whom he developed an auction website.

In 2001, he founded Unoh, a games company, that was bought by Zynga in 2010.

Yamada became a billionaire following Mercari's IPO in June 2018.

References

Living people
Japanese company founders
1970s births
Waseda University alumni